The 2019 FIG World Cup circuit in Artistic Gymnastics is a series of competitions officially organized and promoted by the International Gymnastics Federation (FIG) in 2019.  All four of the Apparatus World Cup series competitions (Melbourne, Baku, Doha, and Cottbus) will serve as opportunities for gymnasts to earn points towards Olympic qualification through the FIG Artistic Gymnastics World Cup series route.

Schedule

World Cup series

World Challenge Cup series

Medalists

Men

World Cup series

World Challenge Cup series

World Challenge Cup series winners

Women

World Cup series

World Challenge Cup series

World Challenge Cup series winners

See also
 2019 FIG Rhythmic Gymnastics World Cup series

References

2019 in gymnastics
Artistic Gymnastics World Cup